Paippad Puthenkavu Bhagavathi Temple is an ancient Bhagavathi shrine located at Paippad, Changanacherry, India.
It is situated at paippad, on Changanacherry – Kaviyoor road and 5 km away from Changanacherry. Annual festival is celebrated on Bharani day of Meenam Month (Malayalam Calendar). The procession named Kalamezuthu & Pattu is the one of the most important among the celebration compare to nearby temples.

The Paippad Puthenkavu Bhagavathy Temple is governed by an elected group of Devaswom members from the NSS Karayogam No:286 Paippad East and NSS Karayogam No: 1794 Paippad West.This Devaswom committee is the authorized body which is responsible for looking the day to affairs of the temple.

References

Hindu temples in Kottayam district
Bhagavathi temples in Kerala